Margus Laidre (born 1959 in Tartu) is an Estonian historian and diplomat.

In 1982, he graduated from Tartu University's Department of History.

Diplomatic posts:
 1991 Ambassador to Sweden
 1996 Ambassador to Germany
 1997 Ambassador to the Holy See (from Bonn/Berlin)
 2006 Ambassador to the United Kingdom
 2014 Ambassador to Finland
 2018-2023 Ambassador to Russian Federation

References

Living people
1959 births
20th-century Estonian historians
Estonian diplomats
Ambassadors of Estonia to Sweden
Ambassadors of Estonia to Germany
Ambassadors of Estonia to the United Kingdom
Ambassadors of Estonia to Finland
Ambassadors of Estonia to Russia
University of Tartu alumni
People from Tartu